Zenon Aleksandra Wiśniewski (born 22 December 1959 in Płock) is a Polish politician. He was elected to the Sejm on 25 September 2005, getting 5764 votes in 16 Płock district as a candidate from the Samoobrona Rzeczpospolitej Polskiej list.

See also
Members of Polish Sejm 2005-2007

External links
Zenon Wiśniewski - parliamentary page - includes declarations of interest, voting record, and transcripts of speeches.

1959 births
Living people
Politicians from Płock
Members of the Polish Sejm 2005–2007
Self-Defence of the Republic of Poland politicians